The Centre sportif Léonard-Grondin (historically known as the Aréna Léonard-Grondin and Palais des sports) is the main sport venue and the main arena in Granby, Quebec. It was once host to the Granby Bisons and Granby Prédateurs QMJHL teams. It is currently home of the Granby Inouk of the Quebec Junior Hockey League. The arena was built in 1968 and seats 2,385 people. In 2010–2011, the arena was renovated and enlarged and transformed into a more modern sports venue. It now has three ice rinks and other equipment.

Indoor ice hockey venues in Quebec
Indoor arenas in Quebec
Sports venues in Quebec
Quebec Major Junior Hockey League arenas
Buildings and structures in Granby, Quebec
Sport in Granby, Quebec
1968 establishments in Quebec
Sports venues completed in 1968